XVI Partsezd is a rural locality (a village) in Kamyshlovskoye Rural Settlement of Lyubinsky District, Russia. The population was 315 as of 2010.

Streets 
 Kalinina
 Rabochaya
 Tsentralnaya

Geography 
XVI Partsezd is located 14 km southeast of Lyubinsky (the district's administrative centre) by road. Fyodorovka is the nearest rural locality.

References 

Rural localities in Omsk Oblast